Vidas Mikalauskas (born 10 August 1955 in Krokialaukis, Lithuania) is a Lithuanian politician representing the Social Democratic Party. He was elected to the Parliament of Lithuania on 21 June 2015 in the constituency of Varėna-Eišiškės, after the previous MP Algis Kašėta was elected as Varėna district mayor. He started in the parliament on 29 June 2015.

Mikalauskas was a member of the Lithuanian Centre Party from 2005, before joining the Social Democratic Party in 2011.

References

1955 births
Living people
Members of the Seimas
Lithuanian Centre Party politicians
Social Democratic Party of Lithuania politicians
Lithuanian University of Educational Sciences alumni
21st-century Lithuanian politicians